Aristide Aubert du Petit-Thouars (31 August 1760 – 2 August 1798) was a French naval officer, and participant of the humiliating French defeat at the Battle of the Nile, where he was killed in action.

Biography 
He was born on 31 August 1760, in Boumois Castle, near Saumur. He studied at the Collège Royal de La Flèche, and entered the French Navy in 1778. He participated that same year in the Battle of Ouessant.

He then served in the Antilles, under Luc Urbain de Bouexic, comte de Guichen, against George Brydges Rodney on the 80-gun . He was at the Battle of the Saintes.

He was promoted to lieutenant in 1792. He left that year on board the 12-gun brig Diligent, in search of Jean-François de La Pérouse. In Brazil, he was imprisoned by the Portuguese, but released in 1793. After that he lived for three years in the United States.

During the battle, his men heavily battered , inflicting casualties of 50 killed, including Captain George Blagdon Westcott, and 143 wounded. After having lost both legs and an arm, he continued to command from a bucket filled with wheat until he died.

His last order was allegedly to nail the flag of the Tonnant to her mizzen-mast and never to surrender the ship. The Tonnant was eventually captured by the British.

Family 
 brother:
 Louis-Marie Aubert du Petit-Thouars (1758–1831), French botanist
 Their nephew:
  (1769-1829), aide-de-camp to General Vignolle, later deputy prefect of Saint-Malo
 Their grandnephew and Abel Ferdinand Aubert's son:
 Abel Aubert du Petit-Thouars (1793–1864), was a French Navy admiral and botanist, took possession of Tahiti for France.
 Their great-grandnephew and Abel Ferdinand's grandson (by his daughter Sidonie):
 Abel-Nicolas Bergasse du Petit-Thouars (1832–1890), a French Navy admiral who participated to the Boshin War in Japan.
 note that Abel-Nicolas Bergasse was Abel Aubert's nephew, but also became his adopted son

References

External links 
 

1760 births
1798 deaths
Dupetit Thouars family
French Navy officers
French Republican military leaders killed in the French Revolutionary Wars